Tamás Tajthy (born 29 August 1991) is a Hungarian football midfielder who plays for Ajka.

Career
He made his debut on 1 August 2010, in the opening day of the 2010/11 Hungarian National Championship against Győr, coming off the bench in the 60th minute. In the next round he played the whole 90 minutes against Kaposvári Rákóczi. He scored his first goal in the third round in style. He came as a substitute in the 78th minute, his team being a goal down. Seven minutes later, after a corner was headed out, he took the rebound and bombed straight into the left top corner, saving a point for his team.

Club statistics

Updated to games played as of 1 June 2014.

External links
 Player profile at HLSZ 
 

1991 births
Living people
Sportspeople from Miskolc
Hungarian footballers
Hungary under-21 international footballers
Association football midfielders
Újpest FC players
Lombard-Pápa TFC footballers
Mezőkövesdi SE footballers
Győri ETO FC players
BFC Siófok players
FC Ajka players
Nemzeti Bajnokság I players
Nemzeti Bajnokság II players